Guizotia is a genus of African herbs in the family Asteraceae.  They are often known as sunflecks.  The species Guizotia abyssinica is occasionally found outside of cultivation in Europe, North America and Asia.

 Species

References

Flora of Africa
Asteraceae genera
Millerieae
Taxa named by Henri Cassini